Uzbekistan competed at the 2019 World Aquatics Championships in Gwangju, South Korea from 12 to 28 July.

Artistic swimming

Uzbekistan entered five artistic swimmers.

Women

Mixed

Diving

Uzbekistan entered three divers.

Men

Swimming

Uzbekistan entered seven swimmers.

Men

Women

References

Nations at the 2019 World Aquatics Championships
Uzbekistan at the World Aquatics Championships
2019 in Uzbekistani sport